Stadionul Comunal is a multi-use stadium in Alparea, Romania. It is used mostly for football matches and is the home ground of CS Oșorhei. The stadium holds 1,000 people.

References

Gallery

Football venues in Romania
Buildings and structures in Bihor County